Simon Montacute (died 1345) was a medieval Bishop of Worcester and Bishop of Ely.

Montacute was the third son of William Montagu, 2nd Baron Montagu (d. 18 October 1319), by Elizabeth Montfort (d. August 1354), daughter of Sir Piers Montfort of Beaudesert, Warwickshire. He had two elder brothers, John, who died in August 1317, and William Montagu, 1st Earl of Salisbury, and a younger brother, Edward Montagu, 1st Baron Montagu, who married Alice of Norfolk, daughter of Thomas of Brotherton and granddaughter of Edward I. Among his seven sisters were Elizabeth, Prioress of Halliwell, and Maud and Isabel, successively Abbesses of Barking from 1341 to 1358.

Montacute was nominated to the see of Worcester on 11 December 1333 and consecrated on 8 May 1334. and was then translated to the see of Ely on 14 March 1337. As bishop of Ely, he was involved in the foundation of Peterhouse, Cambridge, being largely responsible for an early set of statutes for the college. He died on 20 June 1345.

Citations

References

External links
'Elizabeth De Montacute née Montfort', History of Henley Series Retrieved 22 October 2013

Bishops of Ely
Bishops of Worcester
1345 deaths
14th-century English Roman Catholic bishops
Year of birth unknown
Simon
Younger sons of barons